Kortepohja is a district in Jyväskylä, Finland. The population of Kortepohja was 8,084 in December 2020.

Neighborhoods of the district include Kortepohja student village, Kortesuo, Kortemäki, Korteniitty, Laajavuori and Haukkala. Also the Laajavuori Ski Resort is located on the district. A Child Psychiatric Institute is located in Haukkala.

Kortepohja student village
The construction of the student village began in the 1960s to solve the issue of finding apartments for students of the Jyväskylä Educational College, the predecessor of the University of Jyväskylä. It is owned by the Student Union of the University of Jyväskylä. Approximately 2 000 students live in the village. All rooms in Kortepohja are rented unfurnished but basic furniture is available in the storage rooms. Laundry facilities, saunas and meeting rooms are available in the buildings.

Laajavuori Ski Resort

Laajavuori Ski Resort has 12 slopes and 6 lifts for alpine skiing. The longest slope is 915 meters with 106 meters top vertical. The resort hosts FIS ski slopestyle world cup competitions. Laajavuori forests host 62 kilometres cross country skiing tracks with four lean-tos.

Gallery

Notable people 

 Gettomasa, rapper
 Topi Nättinen, ice hockey player

References

Literature

External links

Kortepohja Student village
Laajavuori Ski Resort
Ravintola Rentukka (Restaurant Marsh Marigold) 
City of Jyväskylä

Neighbourhoods of Jyväskylä